MLIA may refer to:

MyLifeIsAverage, a humor web site
Maxillary lateral incisor agenesis